Ch'apiri (Aymara ch'api thorn, -(i)ri a suffix, also spelled Chapairi) is a  mountain in the Andes of Bolivia. It is located in the Oruro Department, Sajama Province, Curahuara de Carangas Municipality. It lies east of a village of that name. The Ch'apiri River originates at the mountain.. It flows to Curahuara de Carangas in the north.

References 

Mountains of Oruro Department